Good To Me is a live album by American soul singer-songwriter Otis Redding, recorded at the Whisky a Go Go on Sunset Strip in Los Angeles, California in April 1966. The recording was made before Otis Redding attained crossover fame at the Monterey Pop Festival, and with his regular touring band.  His other available live performances, the 1967 European Stax/Volt revue and 1967 Monterey Pop Festival are recorded with Booker T. & the M.G.'s and The Mar-Keys horns.

Eight of the tracks on this album (3–6, 9–12) were originally released on Recorded Live: Previously Unreleased Performances (Atlantic SD 19346).  However, the rights to the recordings had reverted to Stax from Atlantic in 1972 and erroneously submitted back to Atlantic for that release.  This album corrects the mistake by reissuing the album on the Stax label while including additional bonus material.

Good To Me (1993) track listing

Recorded Live (1982) track listing

Note: The individual song timings do not include either applause or spoken introductions between selections

Personnel
 Otis Redding – vocals
 James Young – guitar
 Robert Holloway – tenor saxophone
 Robert Pittman – tenor saxophone
 Donald Henry – tenor saxophone
 Sammy Coleman – trumpet
 John Farris – trumpet
 Clarence Johnson – trombone
 Ralph Stewart – bass guitar
 Elbert Woodson – drums

References

Otis Redding albums
Live albums published posthumously
1993 live albums
1982 live albums
Albums produced by Al Jackson Jr.
Stax Records live albums
Albums recorded at the Whisky a Go Go